Alfredo Arango Narváez (16 February 1945 – 20 December 2005) was a Colombian international footballer. He competed for the Colombia national football team at the 1968 Summer Olympics.

Career
Born in Santa Marta, Arango played professional football in Colombia. The midfielder spent most of his playing career with Unión Magdalena. He won the Colombian league title with Unión in 1968, and is the club's all-time leading goal-scorer with 104 total goals. He also won league titles with Millonarios (1972) and Atlético Junior (1977).

Arango played for the Colombia national football team at the 1968 Summer Olympics in Mexico City.

Personal
In December 2005, Arango died in his home city of Santa Marta.

References

External links

1945 births
2005 deaths
Colombian footballers
Olympic footballers of Colombia
Footballers at the 1968 Summer Olympics
Unión Magdalena footballers
Millonarios F.C. players
Atlético Bucaramanga footballers
Atlético Junior footballers
Categoría Primera A players
Association football midfielders
Colombia international footballers
People from Santa Marta
Sportspeople from Magdalena Department